Dru Joyce III (born January 29, 1985) is an American basketball coach and former professional player who is an associate head coach for the Duquesne Dukes men’s team. His coaching career began in 2019–20 with the Cleveland State Vikings men's team after a 12-year professional playing career in Europe. He retired as the all-time assists leader in Germany's Basketball Bundesliga (since eclipsed). Joyce is a close friend of LeBron James and was his teammate at St. Vincent–St. Mary High School.

Joyce's father and brother are both basketball coaches in Ohio. , Dru Joyce II was the head coach at St. Vincent–St. Mary High School and his brother, Cameron, was the head coach at Saint Ignatius High School.

References

External links
Duquesne Dukes bio

1985 births
Living people
Akron Zips men's basketball players
American expatriate basketball people in Belarus
American expatriate basketball people in France
American expatriate basketball people in Germany
American expatriate basketball people in Monaco
American expatriate basketball people in Poland
American men's basketball players
AS Monaco Basket players
Basketball players from Akron, Ohio
Basketball Löwen Braunschweig players
Basketball players from Ohio
BC Tsmoki-Minsk players
Cleveland State Vikings men's basketball coaches
Czarni Słupsk players
Duquesne Dukes men's basketball coaches
EWE Baskets Oldenburg players
FC Bayern Munich basketball players
Limoges CSP players
Point guards
Ratiopharm Ulm players
s.Oliver Würzburg players
Science City Jena players
St. Vincent–St. Mary High School alumni